The SVB Eerste Divisie is the highest football championship for clubs run by the Surinaamse Voetbal Bond. The Topklasse is at the top of the system of Surinamese football championships. The league currently comprises twelve teams and operates a system of promotion and relegation. Seasons run from November to June of the next year, with teams playing 30 games in the regular season. The league was known as the Hoofdklasse but became Topklasse beginning with the 2016–17 season, and then from the 2017–18 season forward, the Eerste Divisie.

The competition was founded in 1924, when Suriname was still a Dutch colony.

History
At the beginning of the 20th century the NGVB (Guyaneesche Dutch Football Association) was founded. The rival Suriname Football Association was founded on October 1, 1920. There had long been animosity between the two unions, but the opening of the stadium by M. de la Fuente a reconciliation was brought about between the unions. The first club formed by the SVB, which still occupies an important place within the Surinamese top flight, was Voorwaarts. This club recently celebrated its 90th anniversary (August 1, 2009). On January 15, 1921, Transvaal was established. Before the SVB was founded, there was already another association with the same name. It was founded in 1914. With the creation of the current SVB came a newfound momentum in the development of Surinamese football. In 2016 the Hoofdklasse was formed into Topklassse. To develop a professional league in Suriname and to get the Surinamese people to support  the league and national selection, the SVB signed a deal with Telecommunications Company of Suriname Telesur on 30 September 2016. In this deal Telesur's daughter company ATV has received the rights to broadcast all Surinamese matches live. ATV will also establish a program that will provide viewers with soccer news to keep them up to date with the SVB and the football in Suriname.

Members for 2020–21

Past Champions

<div style="text-align:left">

<div style="text-align:left">

<div style="text-align:left">

Source for list of champions: RSSSF

Number of titles

Stadiums

The following is a current list of stadiums in the SVB Topklasse;

Top scorers

See also
 List of SVB Hoofdklasse top scorers
 Surinamese Footballer of the Year

References

External links
 Hoofdklasse at svb.sr 

 

 
1
Suriname
1924 establishments in Suriname
Sports leagues established in 1924